Kalpana is a 1948 Indian Hindi-language dance film written and directed by dancer Uday Shankar. It is his only film. The story revolves around a young dancer's dream of setting up a dance academy, a reflection of Shankar's own academy, which he founded at Almora. It starred Uday Shankar and his wife Amala Shankar as leads and 16-year-old actress Padmini, making her screen debut. It also marks Usha Kiran's debut film too.

Kalpana was the first film to present an Indian classical dancer in the leading role, and was entirely shot as a dance ballet and a fantasy.

It was shown at the International Film Festival of India (IFFI-Goa) (2008), as a part of the section "Treasures from NFAI" (National Film Archive of India), with other "rare gems" from the archives.

Cast

 Uday Shankar as Udayan & Writer
 Amala Uday Shankar as Uma
 Lakshmi Kanta as Kamini
 Dr. G. V. Subbarao as Drawing Master
 Birendra Banerji as Noor
 Swaraj Mitter Gupta as Ramesh
 Anil Kumar Chopra as Madan & School Teacher 
 Brijo Behari Banerji as Uma's Father
 Chiranjilal Shah as Gope 
 Devilal Samar as Sundar

 K. Mukerjee as Grandfather 
 Dulal Sen as Mama
 G. V. Karandikar as Producer
 Nagen Dey as Mill Owner
 Ganesh Banerji as Theater Manager
 Syd Jalaluddin as Mukhiya
 Farman Ali as Young Udayan
 Begam Zamarudh as Young Uma
 Yousuf Ali as Young Noor

Songs
The music was composed by Vishnudas Shirali, and the lyrics were penned by Sumitranandan Pant. The Bhil folk songs were written by Devilal Samar.

Production

Well known Tamil actress and dancer, Lakshmikantham, credited in the film as "Lakshmi Kanta" plays Kamini. 16-year-old actress Padmini and along with her sister Lalitha, makes their debut into Hindi films. Tamil dancer and actress Yoga of the Yoga-Mangalam sisters makes an appearance as a dancer credited as "Yogam". Small role actress P. K. Saraswathi credited as "Saraswathi" also appears as a dancer. Gopal Rao, who played a small role in Thyaga Bhoomi (1939 film), also plays a small role. Finally, Usha Kiran made her debut into films in this movie, credited as "Usha".

Restoration
In 2009, the film process of digital restoration was taken up by NFAI in collaboration with France-based Thomson Foundation. In 2010, it was being restored by the World Cinema Foundation (director Martin Scorsese is a founding member).

References

External links
 

1948 films
1940s Hindi-language films
Indian black-and-white films
Indian dance films
1940s fantasy films
Indian fantasy films
Films shot in Tamil Nadu
Gemini Studios films